The Stenopodainae are a subfamily of Reduviidae (assassin bugs). Many species of this subfamily are endemic to tropical rainforests, and some smear their fore legs with sticky, plant-derived resin, to aid in prey capture.

Genera
These 22 genera belong to the subfamily Stenopodainae:
 Apronius Stål
 Aulacogenia Stål, 1870 a
 Bardesanes Distant, 1909 a
 Canthesancus Amyot and Serville, 1843 a
 Caunus Stål, 1865 a
 Ctenotrachelus Stål, 1868 i c g b
 Diaditus Stål, 1859 i c g b
 Duriocoris Miller, 1940
 Gnathobleda Stål, 1859 i c g b
 Hemisastrapada Livingstone and Ravichandran, 1988 a
 Kumaonocoris Miller 1952 a
 Narvesus Stål, 1859 i c g b
 Neoklugia Distant 1919 a
 Neothodelmus Distant 1919 a
 Oncocephalus Klug, 1830 i c g b a
 Pnirontis Stål, 1859 i c g b
 Pygolampis Germar, 1825 i c g b a
 Sastrapada Amyot and Serville, 1843 a
 Staccia Stål, 1865 a
 Stenopoda Laporte, 1832 i c g b
 Streptophorocoris Miller 1957 a
 Thodelmus Stål, 1859 a
Data sources: i = ITIS, c = Catalogue of Life, g = GBIF, b = Bugguide.net a = Ambrose 2006

References

Reduviidae
Hemiptera subfamilies